Cormocephalus is a genus of centipedes of the family Scolopendridae, containing the following species:

Cormocephalus abundantis González-Sponga, 2000
Cormocephalus aeruginosus Attems, 1928
Cormocephalus albidus Kraepelin, 1903
Cormocephalus amazonae (R. Chamberlin, 1914)
Cormocephalus ambiguus (Brandt, 1841)
Cormocephalus amphieurys (Kohlrausch, 1878)
Cormocephalus andinus (Kraepelin, 1903)
Cormocephalus anechinus (Chamberlin, 1957)
Cormocephalus arantsoae Saussure & Zehntner, 1902
Cormocephalus aurantiipes (Newport, 1844)
Cormocephalus bevianus Lawrence, 1960
Cormocephalus bonaerius Attems, 1928
Cormocephalus brachyceras L. E. Koch, 1983
Cormocephalus brasiliensis Humbert & Saussure, 1870
Cormocephalus brevicornis Kraepelin, 1903
Cormocephalus brincki Lawrence, 1955
Cormocephalus bungalbinensis L. E. Koch, 1983
Cormocephalus büttneri Kraepelin, 1903
Cormocephalus cognatus Ribaut, 1923
Cormocephalus coynei L. E. Koch, 1984
Cormocephalus cupipes Pocock, 1891
Cormocephalus delta Edgecombe & Waldock, 2019
Cormocephalus denticaudus Jangi & Dass, 1984
Cormocephalus dentipes Pocock, 1891
Cormocephalus deventeri Lawrence, 1970
Cormocephalus devylderi Porat, 1893
Cormocephalus edithae González-Sponga, 2000
Cormocephalus elegans Kraepelin 1903
Cormocephalus esulcatus Pocock, 1901
Cormocephalus facilis González-Sponga, 2000
Cormocephalus ferox Saussure & Zehntner, 1902
Cormocephalus flavescens Kraepelin, 1903
Cormocephalus fontinalis (Attems, 1928)
Cormocephalus gervaisianus (C. L. Koch, 1841)
Cormocephalus glabratus González-Sponga, 2000
Cormocephalus gracilipes Saussure & Zehntner, 1902
Cormocephalus granulipes Lawrence, 1958
Cormocephalus granulosus Ribaut, 1923
Cormocephalus guildingii Newport, 1845
Cormocephalus hartmeyeri Kraepelin, 1908
Cormocephalus hirtipes (Ribaut, 1923)
Cormocephalus humilis Attems, 1928
Cormocephalus impressus Porat, 1876
Cormocephalus impulsus Lewis, 1989
Cormocephalus incongruens Kraepelin, 1903
Cormocephalus inermipes Pocock, 1891
Cormocephalus inermis (Kraepelin, 1916)
Cormocephalus inopinatus (Kraepelin, 1908)
Cormocephalus insulanus Attems, 1928
Cormocephalus katangensis Goffinet, 1969
Cormocephalus kraepelini Attems, 1930
Cormocephalus laevipes Pocock, 1891
Cormocephalus lineatus Newport, 1845
Cormocephalus lissadellensis L. E. Koch, 1983
Cormocephalus longipes Ribaut, 1923
Cormocephalus macrosestrus (Attems, 1928)
Cormocephalus maritimo González-Sponga, 2000
Cormocephalus mecistopus Brolemann, 1922
Cormocephalus mecutinus Attems, 1928
Cormocephalus mediosulcatus Attems, 1928
Cormocephalus milloti R. F. Lawrence, 1960
Cormocephalus minor Chamberlin, 1927
Cormocephalus mixtus (Ribaut, 1923)
Cormocephalus monilicornis Wood, 1862
Cormocephalus monteithi L. E. Koch, 1983
Cormocephalus multispinosus Attems, 1909
Cormocephalus multispinus (Kraepelin, 1903)
Cormocephalus mundus Chamberlin, 1955
Cormocephalus neocaledonicus (Kraepelin, 1903)
Cormocephalus nigrificatus Verhoeff, 1937
Cormocephalus nitidus Porat, 1871
Cormocephalus novaehollandiae (Kraepelin, 1908)
Cormocephalus nudipes Jangi & Dass, 1984
Cormocephalus oligoporus Kraepelin, 1903
Cormocephalus pallidus Silvestri, 1899
Cormocephalus papuanus Attems, 1914
Cormocephalus parcespinatus Porat, 1893
Cormocephalus philippinensis Kraepelin, 1903
Cormocephalus pilosus Jangi, 1955
Cormocephalus pontifex Attems, 1928
Cormocephalus pseudopunctatus Kraepelin, 1903
Cormocephalus punctatus Porat, 1871
Cormocephalus pustulatus Kraepelin, 1903
Cormocephalus pygmaeus Pocock, 1892
Cormocephalus pyropygus Edgecombe & Waldock, 2019
Cormocephalus rhodesianus Lawrence, 1955
Cormocephalus rubriceps (Newport, 1843)
Cormocephalus rugosus Ribaut, 1923
Cormocephalus sagmus Edgecombe & Waldock, 2019
Cormocephalus setiger Porat, 1871
Cormocephalus similis L. E. Koch, 1983
Cormocephalus spinosior L. E. Koch, 1983
Cormocephalus strigosus Kraepelin, 1908
Cormocephalus subspinulosus Machado, 1951
Cormocephalus tingonus Chamberlin, 1957
Cormocephalus tricuspis Kraepelin, 1916
Cormocephalus tumidus Lawrence, 1960
Cormocephalus turneri Pocock, 1901
Cormocephalus ungueserratus Verhoeff, 1941
Cormocephalus ungulatus (Meinert, 1886)
Cormocephalus venezuelianus (Brölemann, 1898)
Cormocephalus westangelasensis L. E. Koch, 1983
Cormocephalus westwoodi (Newport, 1844)

References

Further reading

Centipede genera